The 2023 Nigerian presidential election in Abia State will be held on 25 February 2023 as part of the nationwide 2023 Nigerian presidential election to elect the president and vice president of Nigeria. Other federal elections, including elections to the House of Representatives and the Senate, will also be held on the same date while state elections will be held two weeks afterward on 11 March.

Background
Abia State is a small, Igbo-majority southeastern state; although it is one of the most developed states in the nation, Abia has faced challenges in security as both the nationwide kidnapping epidemic and separatist violence have heavily affected the region. Originally launched ostensibly to defend ethnic Igbos from herdsmen and government attacks, the separatist organization Indigenous People of Biafra's Eastern Security Network began violently enforcing economically destructive weekly lockdowns in 2021 and swiftly were criticized for committing human rights abuses against civilians it was meant to protect. These atrocities coupled with law enforcement brutality and herder–farmer clashes worsened the security situation prior to the election.

Politically, the 2019 elections were categorized as a solidification of the Abia PDP's control but a slight expansion of the APC on the federal level. Statewise, incumbent PDP Governor Okezie Ikpeazu won re-election with over 60% of the vote and the vast majority of House of Assembly seats were won by the PDP. On the other hand, while the PDP was still successful federally, it lost ground only winning seven House of Representatives seats and two Senate seats compared to all nine and all three in 2015. For the presidency, Abia was easily won by PDP nominee Atiku Abubakar with about 68% but still swung towards the APC and had strikingly low turnout.

Polling

Projections

General election

Results

By senatorial district 
The results of the election by senatorial district.

By federal constituency
The results of the election by federal constituency.

By local government area 
The results of the election by local government area.

See also 
 2023 Abia State elections
 2023 Nigerian presidential election

Notes

References 

Abia State gubernatorial election
2023 Abia State elections
Abia